Kooduthurai, or Mukkoodal is a holy place situated in Bhavani near Erode, Tamil Nadu, India.

The place is situated at the confluence of three rivers: Kaveri, Bhavani and the mystic Kisan River. On the banks of Kooduthurai, Thirunana Sangameswarar Temple is located. The name comes from Tamil 'koodu' (join or mingle) and 'thurai' (river bed).

References

Tourist attractions around Erode
Villages in Erode district